Fikriye Hanım, posthumously Zeynep Fikriye Özdinçer, (1887 – 31 May 1924) was a Turkish woman. She was a relative of Mustafa Kemal Atatürk (she was the daughter of Memduh Hayrettin Bey, who was the brother of Ragıp Bey, Zübeyde Hanım's second husband) and his girlfriend. Some sources claim that they have been married for a certain period of time (under "Imam Marriage", "İmam Nikahı" in Turkish). Her unexplained death remains mysterious.

Private life
Fikriye was born in the city of Larissa, in the region of Thessaly, then part of the Kingdom of Greece. Historians agree on her birth year as 1887, while some sources give it as 1897. Her father was Memduh Hayrettin and her mother was Vasfiye. She had a sister Jülide and an elder brother Enver.

It is still discussed whether Fikriye was a niece of Mustafa Kemal. It is asserted that her father Memduh Hayrettin was the brother of Ragıp Bey, the second spouse of Mustafa Kemal's mother Zübeyde Hanım.
	
What is known for certain about Fikriye is that she spoke Greek and French, and played the piano and the oud.

Emotional relationship
Fikriye met Mustafa Kemal in Thessaloniki when she was a young girl. She met him again in Istanbul, where she moved right before the Balkan Wars (1912–1913), and again one year later after the war. She developed an emotional relationship to her step cousin. However, they met sporadically due to Mustafa Kemal's involvement in battles during World War I and the Turkish War of Independence (1919–1922).  During this time, her parents and her sister died one by one Fikriye decided to go to Ankara to meet Mustafa Kemal, who was leading the Turkish National Movement in Ankara. Istanbul was occupied and under military administration of the Allies of World War I. She sailed to Karadeniz Ereğli at the Black Sea and then reached Ankara over Kastamonu. She met Mustafa Kemal and lived with him some time at the direction building of the Turkish State Railways, which Mustafa Kemal used as residence and headquarters. According to some sources, they married by Islamic marital practice -no civil marriage was in use at that time-, and it was kept secret from the public. It is asserted that Mustafa Kemal's mother Zübeyde Hanım (1856–1923) and his sister Makbule (1885–1956) were from a long time ago against a relationship between the two. During the Battle of Sakarya (23 August – 13 September 1921), Mustafa Kemal Pasha,  commander of the Turkish troops, ordered Ankara from the frontline that his paycheck to be handed over to Fikriye. On 28 August 1922, Mustafa Kemal Pasha sent a telegram to Ankara from the frontline of the  Great Offensive (26 August – 18 September 1922), in which he summarized the victorious situation of the battle to his mother and Fikriye.

After the recapture of Greek-occupied Smyrna today İzmir, on 9 September 1922, Mustafa Kemal met Latife, a western-educated member of a wealthy family in İzmir. Meanwhile, Fikriye was sent to Munich, Germany for treatment of respiratory disease. Mustafa Kemal, married Latife on 29 January 1923 in Ankara. He became 
the first President of Turkey following the proclamation of the Republic on 29 October 1923. As Fikriye learned the marriage of Mustafa Kemal, she escaped the sanatorium in Munich, returned to Turkey to see Mustafa Kemal in Ankara. She went to Ankara although Mustafa Kemal sent a telegram saying that "he does not allow her to come to Ankara as she returned to Turkey without his knowledge."

Mysterious death
Fikriye was wounded by a firearm in front of the Çankaya Mansion, official residence of President Mustafa Kemal Atatürk, on 21 May 1924. She died after nine days in the State Hospital in Ankara on 31 May. The prosecutor launched an investigation to clear up the cause of her death. The investigation was prescribed after 30 years, but was twice enlarged for 30 years each. After 90 years, it finally abated leaving the case mysterious whether suicide or homicide. 

The site of her grave is unknown.

Aftermath
Around eleven years after her death, she was registered as Zeynep Fikriye Özdincer by her brother Ali Enver, who adopted the family name Özdincer following the enactment of the Surname Law in Turkey in 1934.

Not much is known officially about her. There are only 26 documents, which are dated mostly between 1920 and 1923, at the Presidential Archives related to her. 

Personal belongings and some private photographs of Fikriye were donated by her  nephew Hayri Özdinçer to the "Atatürk's Residence and Railway Museum" in Ankara in 2006.

Her relationship to Mustafa Kemal is narrated in the play "Fikriye ve Latife – Mustafa Kemal'i Sevdim" by Dilruba Saatçi.

Bibliography

References

1887 births
1924 deaths
People from Larissa
Turkish women
Mustafa Kemal Atatürk
Deaths by firearm in Turkey